Yavapai County High School is an accommodation high school in Prescott Valley, Arizona. Its operator, the Yavapai Accommodation School District, was established in 2001 to serve high school students.

Its current campus opened in the fall of 2004. It was built with $550,000 of funding from the Arizona School Facilities Board. Its listed capacity is 25 students.

References

Public high schools in Arizona
Schools in Yavapai County, Arizona